= FXTV =

FXTV may refer to:

- FXTV, FedEx's internal television channel
- FX Networks
  - FX (TV channel)
